Landscape with Stars is an early 20th century painting by Henri-Edmond Cross. Done in watercolor on white wove paper, the work is a part of the collection of the Metropolitan Museum of Art in New York City.

Reminiscent of Japanese painting, the impressionistic work depicts a star-studded sky above a pen and ink landscape. One art critic described the work as combining decorative and scientific aspects.

References 

1905 paintings
Paintings in the collection of the Metropolitan Museum of Art